Liometopum oligocenicum is an extinct species of Miocene ant in the genus Liometopum. Described by William Morton Wheeler in 1915, the fossils were found in Baltic amber.

References

†
Miocene insects
Prehistoric insects of Europe
Fossil taxa described in 1915
Fossil ant taxa